Deghele Community is an indigenous Itsekiri rural community in Warri Kingdom. Princess Iye Akengbuwa founded Deghele Community for her son, Governor Chanomi. Princess Iye acted as the regent after the death of her father Olu Akengbuwa who was the last Olu of Warri before the interregnum in Warri Kingdom between 1888 and 1936. It is located in Warri South-West local government area of present-day Delta State, Nigeria.

References

See also
Warri

 
Communities of Warri Kingdom
Populated coastal places in Nigeria